Susanne Hilger (born 18 April 1958) is a retired East German swimmer. She competed at the 1972 Summer Olympics in the 100 m and 200 m backstroke, but failed to reach the finals. Between 1969 and 1973 she won five national titles in these two events.

References

1958 births
Living people
German female swimmers
Sportspeople from Rostock
Female backstroke swimmers
Olympic swimmers of East Germany
Swimmers at the 1972 Summer Olympics